MV Wishkah is a future  that will be operated by Washington State Ferries. The vessel will use a hybrid diesel–electric engine and is expected to enter service in 2024, with a capacity of 144 cars and 1,500 passengers. The ferry was named for the Wishkah River on the Olympic Peninsula.

The vessel is planned to be used on the Mukilteo–Clinton ferry, which is also served by sister vessel .

References

Washington State Ferries vessels
Ships built in Seattle